Frailea is a genus of  globular to short cylindrical cacti native to South America. These species are cleistogamous. They were first classified in the genus Echinocactus.

Species
Species accepted by the Plants of the World Online as of October 2022:

References

External links
Frailea web
Cactiguide Frailea

 
Cacti of South America
Cactoideae genera